"Bad Decisions" is a song by American rock band the Strokes, released on February 18, 2020, as the second single from their sixth studio album, The New Abnormal (2020). An accompanying music video was released on the same day. It incorporates elements of the song "Dancing with Myself" by British punk/new wave musician Billy Idol, who is credited as a co-writer along with his former band member Tony James.

The artwork for the song is Café Kiss by Ron Hicks.

Live performances 
On October 31, 2020, the band performed "Bad Decisions" on Saturday Night Live.

Personnel
Adapted from The Strokes official YouTube channel.
Julian Casablancas – vocal, lyricist
Nikolai Fraiture – bass guitar
Albert Hammond Jr. – guitar
Nick Valensi – guitar
Fabrizio Moretti – drums
Billy Idol – composer
Tony James – composer
Jason Lader – engineer, mixing engineer
Pete Min – engineer
Rob Bisel – assistant engineer
Dylan Neustadter – assistant engineer
Kevin Smith – assistant engineer
Stephen Marcussen – mastering engineer
Stewart Whitmore – mastering engineer
Rick Rubin – producer

Charts

Weekly charts

Year-end charts

References

External links

2020 songs
2020 singles
The Strokes songs
American new wave songs
Songs written by Julian Casablancas
Song recordings produced by Rick Rubin
Songs written by Billy Idol
Songs written by Tony James (musician)
Songs written by Nikolai Fraiture
Songs written by Fabrizio Moretti
Songs written by Nick Valensi
Songs written by Albert Hammond Jr.